The 91st Massachusetts General Court, consisting of the Massachusetts Senate and the Massachusetts House of Representatives, met in 1870 during the governorship of Republican William Claflin. Horace H. Coolidge served as president of the Senate and Harvey Jewell served as speaker of the House.

Senators

Representatives

See also
 41st United States Congress
 List of Massachusetts General Courts

References

Further reading
  (includes description of legislature)

External links
 
 

Political history of Massachusetts
Massachusetts legislative sessions
massachusetts
1870 in Massachusetts